South China is a geographical region of China.

South China or Southern China may also refer to:

 One of the regions of China:
 Southern China
 Southeast China
 East China (some geographers include the Taiwan Island, Penghu, Kinmen, Matsu Islands, and Senkaku Islands in this subregion)
 South Central China
 Central China
 South China (including the Hainan Island, Paracel Islands, and Zhongsha Islands
 Southwest China
 South China AA, a sports club best known for its football team which plays in Hong Kong
 South China (continent), an ancient continent studied in geology
 South China, Maine, a village in the town of China in Kennebec County, Maine, United States
 Southern China, an approximate geographical, culture and language region within China